A plenary session or plenum is a session of a conference or deliberative assembly in which all parties or members are present, and there are no absentees. Such a session may include a broad range of content, from keynotes to panel discussions, and is not necessarily related to a specific style of presentation or deliberation.

The term has been used in the teaching profession to describe when information is summarized. This often encourages class participation or networking.

When a session is not fully attended, it must have a quorum: the minimum number of members required to continue process (by the group's charter or bylaws).

Some organizations have standing committees that conduct the organization's business between congresses, conferences, or other meetings. Such committees may themselves have quorum requirements and plenary sessions.

See also

 Floor (legislative)

Compare Quorum

Meetings